Paraclathurella is a genus of sea snails, marine gastropod mollusks in the family Clathurellidae.

Species
Species within the genus Paraclathurella include:
 Paraclathurella aditicola Hedley, 1922
 Paraclathurella clothonis Hedley, 1922
 Paraclathurella densegranosa (Thiele, 1925)
 Paraclathurella gracilenta (Reeve, 1843)
 Paraclathurella padangensis (Thiele, 1925)
 Paraclathurella thecla (Thiele, 1925)

References

External links
  Bouchet, P.; Kantor, Y. I.; Sysoev, A.; Puillandre, N. (2011). A new operational classification of the Conoidea (Gastropoda). Journal of Molluscan Studies. 77(3): 273-308

 
Gastropod genera